The Nokia 6.1 Plus, also known as the Nokia X6 (not to be confused with the 2009 Nokia X6), is a Nokia-branded mid-range smartphone running the Android operating system.

Model TA-1099 (TA-1083)

References
2. *Band 28 is 700mhz 4G/LTE and us used in Australia for Telstra

6.1 Plus
Mobile phones introduced in 2018
Mobile phones with multiple rear cameras
Mobile phones with 4K video recording
Discontinued smartphones